Ralph William Roscoe Eltse (September 13, 1885 – March 18, 1971) was an American lawyer and politician who served one term as a U.S. Representative from California from 1933 to 1935.

Biography
Eltse was born in Oskaloosa, Iowa. He attended the public schools and graduated from Penn College (now William Penn University) in Oskaloosa in 1909 and from Haverford (Pennsylvania) College in 1910.
He moved to Berkeley, California in 1912.
He attended the law department of the University of California at Berkeley.
He was admitted to the bar in 1915 and commenced practice in Berkeley.
He served as a member of the Republican State committee 1932–1935, and was a delegate to the Republican State conventions in 1932, 1934, and 1940.

Congress
Eltse was elected as a Republican to the Seventy-third Congress (March 4, 1933 – January 3, 1935). He was an unsuccessful candidate for re-election in 1934 to the Seventy-fourth Congress and for election in 1940 to the Seventy-seventh Congress.

Later career and death
He resumed the practice of law, and resided in Berkeley until his death on March 18, 1971. He was entombed in Sunset Mausoleum.

References

1885 births
1971 deaths
William Penn University alumni
Haverford College alumni
UC Berkeley School of Law alumni
Republican Party members of the United States House of Representatives from California
People from Oskaloosa, Iowa
20th-century American politicians